Baruun-Urt Airport   is a public airport located in Baruun-Urt, the capital of Sükhbaatar Province in Mongolia.

See also 

 List of airports in Mongolia
 List of airlines of Mongolia

References

External links
 World aero data Baruun-Urt

Airports in Mongolia